Julia Margaret Bray (born 28 September 1952) is a British scholar of Oriental studies who specialises in Medieval to Early Modern Arabic literature. Since 2012, she has been the Laudian Professor of Arabic at the University of Oxford and a Fellow of St John's College, Oxford. She previously taught Arabic and Arabic literature at the universities of Manchester, Edinburgh and St Andrews, and was Professeur de littérature arabe médiévale at the Paris 8 University from 2003 to 2012.

Early life and education
Bray was born on 28 September 1952 in Cambridge, England. She was educated at the Collège Sévigné, a all-girls private school in Paris, France. She read Oriental Studies at St Hilda's College, Oxford, graduating with a Bachelor of Arts (BA) degree in 1974. After working as a archivist, she studied for a Doctor of Philosophy (DPhil) degree at St Cross College, Oxford. She completed her DPhil in 1984.

Academic career
In 1983, Bray joined the University of Manchester as a lecturer in Arabic. She was then a senior lecturer in Arabic at the University of Edinburgh from 1989 to 1992. She was a visiting lecturer at St Antony's College, Oxford for the 1994/95 academic year, and James Mew Senior Research Fellow in Arabic in the Faculty of Oriental Studies, University of Oxford, from 1994 to 1996. She was senior lecturer in Arabic at the University of St Andrews from 1996 to 2003, and then Professeur de littérature arabe médiévale at the University of Paris 8 Vincennes-Saint-Denis from 2003 to 2012.

Since September 2012, she has been the Laudian Professor of Arabic at the University of Oxford. She is also a Fellow of St John's College, Oxford. She co-edits (with Wen-chin Ouyang) the Edinburgh Studies in Classical Arabic Literature monograph series, published by Edinburgh University Press. The chair was renamed the Abdulaziz Saud AlBabtain Laudian Professorship of Arabic in after a re-endowment in 2016, and she is due to retire in 2022.

Bray's research covers medieval Arabic literature (pre-1800), especially poetry, narrative and biography. As well as formal literary analysis of Classical Arabic literature, she uses it as a source for the history of ideas, and to analyse social and cultural meanings.

Selected works

References

Living people
Laudian Professors of Arabic
British orientalists
Fellows of St John's College, Oxford
British Arabists
Academics of the University of Manchester
Academics of the University of Edinburgh
Academics of the University of St Andrews
Academic staff of Paris 8 University Vincennes-Saint-Denis
Alumni of St Hilda's College, Oxford
Alumni of St Cross College, Oxford
British medievalists
Intellectual historians
1952 births